Rachel Ann George-Parton (formerly Dennison, née Parton; born August 31, 1959) is an American retired singer and actress and the youngest sister of entertainer Dolly Parton.

Career
Parton was raised in the Church of God. She is the youngest of twelve children born to Avie Lee Caroline (née Owens; 1923–2003) and Robert Lee Parton Sr. (1921–2000). As well as Dolly Parton, her other celebrity siblings include older brother, entertainer Randy and sister Stella Parton.

As a child, she enjoyed wearing make-up and imitating her favorite stars. She later recalled, "I was the only girl in the first grade that routinely powdered and rouged my face." Dennison also remembered, "I never really wanted to be in show business. I just wanted to raise my kids and keep house, but I guess being in the business is just a 'family tradition'." She quit school after the eighth grade and toured the country with her family, often doing her elder sisters' make-up and occasionally singing backup. At age fifteen, she performed solo on stage for the first time. During her first performance, as she remembers, "right off I saw this new piano man (pianist Richard Dennison) and knew he was the fella for me." She and Dennison were married three years later.

In 1982, Dennison landed her first and only acting role in the ABC television sitcom incarnation of 9 to 5. Before the show premiered, she stated in a People magazine interview: "I'm sure people will compare me to Dolly—it's only human nature." Her role, as bombshell secretary Doralee Rhodes, had been originated by her older sister, Dolly Parton, in the hit 1980 theatrical film of the same name. 9 to 5 was shot before a live studio audience and co-starred Rita Moreno and Valerie Curtin. The series had an impressive beginning in the ratings, but after a retooling (including the addition of Leah Ayres to the cast), the series was canceled by ABC after 33 episodes in 1983. The sitcom proved popular in reruns, leading producers to revive it in first-run syndication in 1986. Sally Struthers joined the cast, and the sitcom's popularity revived, producing another 52 episodes before ending in 1988.

During the network run of the series, she and her fellow cast members appeared on an episode of Battle of the Network Stars in 1983. She performed alongside her sister in a 1987 episode of her sister's variety series Dolly. Dennison's last appearance on camera was during an episode of Bravo Profiles titled "Dolly Parton: Diamond in a Rhinestone World" in 1999. Dennison has since retired from acting. Occasionally, she will sing with her siblings.

References

External links
 
 

1959 births
Living people
American women singers
American actresses
People from Franklin, Tennessee
21st-century American women